Rosalie Ellen Woodruff is an Australian politician. She has represented Franklin in the Tasmanian House of Assembly since 17 August 2015, when she was elected in a countback to replace Nick McKim. She represents the Tasmanian Greens.

She holds a Bachelor of Arts in Professional Writing from the University of Canberra, as well as a Master of Public Health and PhD in Epidemiology from the Australian National University, on the topic of climate and environment as predictors for Ross River Virus.

She has previously contested Franklin for the Australian Greens at the 2013 federal election, and at the state level for the 2014 Tasmanian election. Prior to becoming a member of the Tasmanian Parliament, Woodruff was a local councillor on the Huon Valley Council from 2009.

References

External links

Rosalie Woodruff on YouTube
Rosalie Woodruff's page at Tasmanian Greens MPs website

Year of birth missing (living people)
1960s births
Living people
Members of the Tasmanian House of Assembly
Australian Greens members of the Parliament of Tasmania
Tasmanian local councillors
Australian women epidemiologists
Australian women scientists
Australian National University alumni
University of Canberra alumni
Place of birth missing (living people)
21st-century Australian politicians
21st-century Australian women politicians
Women members of the Tasmanian House of Assembly
Women local councillors in Australia